The Janáček Philharmonic Orchestra (Janáčkova filharmonie Ostrava) is a Czech orchestra based in Ostrava, Czech Republic.  Named after composer Leoš Janáček, the orchestra performs its concerts at the City of Ostrava Cultural Centre.

History
The roots of the orchestra date back to 1929, with the establishment of a radio orchestra in Ostrava.  In 1954, the orchestra was formally established under the name of the Ostrava Symphony Orchestra, with Otakar Pařík as its first chief conductor under that name, and gave its first concert under that name on 3 May 1954.  In 1962, the orchestra changed its name to the Státní filharmonie Ostrava (Ostrava State Philharmonic Orchestra), then with Václav Jiráček as chief conductor.  In 1971, the orchestra changed its name to its current form, the Janáčkova filharmonie Ostrava (Janáček Philharmonic Ostrava).  In the 1990s, the orchestra developed a new emphasis on performance of contemporary music, including renditions of compositions by composers such as Earle Brown, John Cage, Maria de Alvear, Morton Feldman, Petr Kotik, Alvin Lucier, Pauline Oliveros, Somei Satoh, Martin Smolka, Karlheinz Stockhausen, Toru Takemitsu, Edgard Varese, and Christian Wolff.

The most recent chief conductor was Heiko Mathias Förster, from 2014 to 2019.  In December 2018, Vassily Sinaisky first guest-conducted the orchestra.  He returned for a second guest-conducting engagement at the start of the 2019-2020 season.  In April 2020, the orchestra announced the appointment of Sinaisky as its next chief conductor, effective with the 2020-2021 season.  The orchestra's principal guest conductor is Petr Popelka, effective with the 2020-2021 season.

Chief conductors
 Otakar Pařík (1954-1955)
 Jiří Waldhans (1955-1962)
 Václav Jiráček (1962-1966)
 Josef Daniel (1966-1968)
 Otakar Trhlík (1968-1987)
 Tomáš Koutník (1987-1990)
 Dennis Burkh
 Leoš Svárovský (1991-1993)
 Christian Arming (1996-2002)
 Petr Vronský (2002-2004)
 Theodore Kuchar (2005-2012)
 Heiko Mathias Förster (2014-2019)
 Vassily Sinaisky (designate, effective 2020)

References

External links
 
 Ostrava Centre for New Music - Further information
 The Association of Symphony Orchestras and Choirs of the Czech Republic, Czech-language page on the Janáček Philharmonic Orchestra
 Český hudební slovník osob a institucí, Czech-language page on the Janáček Philharmonic Orchestra

Czech orchestras
Ostrava
1954 establishments in Czechoslovakia
Musical groups established in 1954